Kevin Krawietz and Andreas Mies defeated Wesley Koolhof and Neal Skupski in the final, 6–7(3–7), 7–6(7–5), [10–6] to win the doubles tennis title at the 2022 Barcelona Open.

Juan Sebastián Cabal and Robert Farah were the two-time defending champions, but they lost in the quarterfinals to Krawietz and Mies.

The tournament marked the final professional appearance of former doubles world No. 5 and ATP Finals champion David Marrero.

Seeds

Draw

Draw

Qualifying

Seeds

Qualifiers
  Ugo Humbert /  Sebastian Korda

Lucky losers

Qualifying draw

References

External links
 Main draw
 Qualifying draw

Doubles
Barcelona Open Banc Sabadell - Doubles